Danny Sapsford (born 3 April 1969) is a former professional tennis player from Great Britain, who turned professional in 1989. He won one doubles title (1996, Nottingham) during his career. The right-hander reached his highest singles ATP-ranking on 15 April 1996, when he became World No. 170. In 1999, he reached the third round of Wimbledon Championships, defeating Julián Alonso and Galo Blanco before losing to then world number one Pete Sampras in straight sets. This was Sapsford's last singles match as a  professional.

Performance timelines

Singles

Doubles

ATP career finals

Doubles: 3 (1 title, 2 runner-ups)

ATP Challenger and ITF Futures finals

Doubles: 9 (9–0)

External links
 
 

1969 births
English male tennis players
Living people
People from Walton-on-Thames
People from Weybridge
British male tennis players
Tennis people from Surrey